Fosburgh is a surname. Notable people with the surname include:
 
James Whitney Fosburgh (1910–1978), American painter, art collector, and art historian
Lacey Fosburgh (1942–1993), American journalist, author, and academic